Abderrahmene Bensaci Stadium, is a multi-use stadium in Merouana, Algeria.  It is currently used mostly for football matches and is the home ground of AB Mérouana.  The stadium holds 10,000 spectators.

References

External links
Stadium Information
dzfoot club profile 

Football venues in Algeria
Buildings and structures in Batna Province